Telemundo Station Group is the division of NBCUniversal Owned TV Stations (NBCUniversal), a subsidiary of Comcast that oversees their Telemundo owned-and-operated television stations and the TeleXitos network. The NBC owned-and-operated stations are held in the separate NBC Owned Television Stations division.

History

Telemundo was formed as NetSpan in 1984 by the owners of WNJU in Linden, New Jersey (serving the New York City area) and KSTS in San Jose, California. These stations joined KVEA in Los Angeles in 1985. The following year, KVEA's part-owner, Reliance Group Holdings, purchased John Blair & Co., which owned WKAQ-TV in San Juan, Puerto Rico, branded on air as Telemundo, and WSCV in Fort Lauderdale–Miami-West Palm Beach. In late 1986, Reliance took control over WNJU and KSTS.

In 1987, Reliance merged all these stations into the Telemundo Group. The new corporation quickly went public, and in 1987, Reliance decided to rebrand NetSpan as Telemundo. It then established KTMD in Houston and KVDA in San Antonio.

On November 9, 1995, Ensaness Communications sold a 74.5% controlling interest in WSNS-TV in Chicago to Telemundo for $44.7 million, with Essaness retaining a 25.5% stake. Essaness would later sell its stake in the partnership to Telemundo in 2003.

In 1997, Liberty Media and Sony Pictures Entertainment purchased a majority interest in Telemundo from Reliance Capital Group. NBC would then purchase Telemundo from Sony and Liberty Media in 2001. Telemundo in 2001 would also acquire KXTX-TV in Dallas.

In April 2002, NBC bought then Holbrook, Arizona station KPHZ (now KTAZ) and its translators un Phoenix, Arizona (KPHZ-LP and KPSW-LP) from Venture Technologies Group for $7,5 million. It was finalized on September 26, 2002. In 2005, NBC/Telemundo successfully got FCC approval to swap licenses with the Daystar Network's owned KDTP: the KPHZ license moved from Holbrook to Phoenix, broadcasting on channel 39. Daystar's KDTP license then moved from Phoenix to Holbrook, broadcasting on channel 11. These changes were completed in 2006.

In September 2002, NBC agreed to acquire WPXB in the Boston area from Paxson Communications, with the intention of making it a Telemundo owned-and-operated station. Paxson, which was in the process of selling some of its stations in order to raise $100 million, had originally planned to sell WPXB to another company, but NBC had a right of first refusal on Paxson's stations in the fifty largest markets, which it had obtained when it acquired a 32 percent stake in Paxson in 1999. NBC completed its purchase of WPXB on October 29, 2002; two days later, the call letters were changed to WNEU.

On October 8, 2002, NBC announced that it would acquire three Telemundo affiliates: KHRR (in Tucson) and KDRX-CA (in Phoenix) from Television Apogeo, and KNSO (in Fresno) from Sainte Partners II, L.P. The sale of Arizona stations were completed on January 1, 2003; while the acquisition of the Telemundo-affiliate in Fresno was completed on April 30, 2003.

On February 23, 2005, NBC bought Telemundo affiliate KBLR for $32.1 million.
The sale was completed on May 24, 2005.

In January 2006, NBCUniversal agreed to buy Denver's KDEN-TV from Longmont Broadcasting. The acquisition was completed on July 13. In November, NBCUniversal agreed to donate Steamboat Springs' KMAS-TV (who was the main Telemundo affiliate for Denver before NBC's acquisition of KDEN) to Rocky Mountain Public Broadcasting Network. The donation was completed on July 26, 2007.

On January 26, 2011, NBCUniversal announced the sale of its Spanish-language independent station KWHY-TV to the Meruelo Group due to its pending merger with Comcast. The sale was completed on July 1.

On March 21, 2013, NBCUniversal entered into an agreement to acquire WWSI from ZGS Communications for $20 million. Prior to the sale agreement, WWSI had been the largest station (in terms of market size) aligned with Telemundo that was not an owned-and-operated station of the network. The deal created a duopoly with NBC-owned Philadelphia station WCAU. The sale was completed on July 2.

In July 2013, NBC Owned Television Stations and Telemundo's owned stations were brought together under a newly formed division, NBCUniversal Owned Television Stations, under NBC TV Station president Valari Staab.

In 2017, NBCUniversal announced that it was hiring people for NBC-owned KNSD in San Diego with the intention of launching a new Telemundo-owned station in the area, replacing Tijuana, Mexico-licensed station XHAS-TDT (whose affiliation expired at the end of June 2017). The new Telemundo affiliate, branded as "Telemundo 20", launched on July 1 on KNSD's digital 39.20 subchannel. On September 12, 2017, NBCUniversal acquired KUAN-LD from NRJ TV, LLC, to serve as San Diego's Telemundo station instead; the sale was completed on December 21, 2017.

On December 4, 2017, NBCUniversal announced its purchase of ZGS Communications's ten Spanish-language television stations.
The sale was completed in early 2018. Two of the stations (WRIW-CD and WZGS-CD) were filed separately, as ZGS were negotiating channel sharing agreements at the time of the sale. Those sales were completed in July 2018.

On March 5, 2019, KCSO-LD in Sacramento, California and KTMW in Salt Lake City (and their respective repeater stations) were acquired from Serestar Communications.

On July 30, 2021 NBCUniversal announced it was buying Albuquerque, New Mexico Telemundo affiliate KASA-TV and its repeater stations for $12.5 million dollars. In the short term NBC announced it was entering a transitional services agreement Gray Television, which had purchased Fox affiliate KJTV-TV and other Ramar television assets in Lubbock, Texas earlier in 2021. The deal will give NBCU Telemundo station group 31 stations and marks the end of 23 years of Ramar's ownership of the Telemundo affiliation in the city.

Stations

Former

References

External links
 

 
NBCUniversal
Telemundo
Television broadcasting companies of the United States
NBCUniversal television stations
Owned-and-operated television stations in the United States